Nikolai Dmitriyevich Titkov (born 18 August 2000) is a Russian football player who plays as a central midfielder for FC Orenburg on loan from FC Lokomotiv Moscow.

Club career
He made his debut in the Russian Professional Football League for FC Kazanka Moscow on 17 July 2019 in a game against FC Kolomna.

He made his debut for the senior squad of FC Lokomotiv Moscow on 25 September 2019 in a Russian Cup game against FC Baltika Kaliningrad.

He made his Russian Premier League debut for Lokomotiv on 5 December 2020 in a game against FC Rubin Kazan, he substituted Vitaly Lisakovich in the 90th minute of the game.

On 19 June 2021, he joined FC Orenburg on loan. On 16 June 2022, Titkov returned to Orenburg, again on loan.

Career statistics

References

External links
 
 
 

2000 births
Sportspeople from Ryazan
Living people
Russian footballers
Association football midfielders
FC Lokomotiv Moscow players
FC Orenburg players
Russian Premier League players
Russian First League players
Russian Second League players